Christian Gustav Wilhelm Müller (17 February 1857, Mühlberg near Erfurt – 18 February 1940) was a German zoologist specializing in Ostracoda.

In 1895 he succeeded Carl Eduard Adolph Gerstaecker as director of the zoological museum at Greifswald, a position he maintained until 1923. 

He was the taxonomic authority of numerous taxa in Ostracoda; a few examples being the subfamily Conchoeciinae and the genera Archiconchoecia, Cytherois and Stenocypria. In 1965, the genus Muellerina Bassiouni (family Hemicytheridae) was named in his honor.

Written works 
 Neue Cypridiniden, 1891 - New Cypridinidae.
 Die Ostracoden des Golfes von Neapel und der angrenzenden Meeres-Abschnitte, 1894 - Ostracods from the Gulf of Naples and adjacent marine areas.
 Ostracoda, 1894 - Ostracoda.
 Deutschlands Süswasser-Ostracoden, 1900 - German freshwater ostracods.
 Die Ostracoden der Siboga-Expedition, 1906 - Ostracoda from the Siboga Expedition.
 Ostracoden aus Java, 1906 - Ostracods of Java.
 Die Ostracoden der deutschen Südpolar-Expedition, 1908  (In: Erich von Drygalski, Deutsche Südpolar-Expedition, 1901-1903). Ostracods from the German South Polar Expedition.
He was author of the section on ostracods in the series Das Tierreich (Das Tierreich/ 31 : Crustacea, Ostracoda / bearb. von G. W. Müller, 1912).

References 

1857 births
1940 deaths
Academic staff of the University of Greifswald
German carcinologists
People from Gotha (district)